Věra Chytilová (2 February 1929 – 12 March 2014) was an avant-garde Czech film director and pioneer of Czech cinema. Banned by the Czechoslovak government in the 1960s, she is best known for her Czech New Wave film, Sedmikrásky (Daisies). Her subsequent films screened at international film festivals, including Vlčí bouda (1987), which screened at the 37th Berlin International Film Festival, A Hoof Here, a Hoof There (1989), which screened at the 16th Moscow International Film Festival, and The Inheritance or Fuckoffguysgoodday (1992), which screened at the 18th Moscow International Film Festival. For her work, she received the Ordre des Arts et des Lettres, Medal of Merit and the Czech Lion award.

Early life and education
Chytilová was born in Ostrava, Czechoslovakia, on 2 February 1929. She had a strict Catholic upbringing, which would later come to influence many of the moral questions presented in her films.

While attending college, Chytilová initially studied philosophy and architecture, but abandoned these fields. She then worked as a draftswoman, a fashion model and as a photo re-toucher before working as a clapper girl for the Barrandov Film Studios in Prague.  She then sought a recommendation from Barrandov Film Studios to study film production, but was denied. Undeterred by the rejection, she would later be accepted into the Film and TV School of the Academy of Performing Arts in Prague (FAMU) at the age of 28, the first woman to study directing at the school.  While attending FAMU, she studied underneath renowned film director Otakar Vavra, before graduating in 1962.

Career
Upon her graduation from FAMU, both of Chytilová's short films had a theatrical release throughout Czechoslovakia. In 1963 Chytilová released her first feature film entitled Something Different.

Chytilová is best known for her once highly controversial film Sedmikrásky (Daisies; 1966). Daisies is known for its unsympathetic characters, lack of a continuous narrative and abrupt visual style. Chytilová states that she structured Daisies to “restrict [the spectator’s] feeling of involvement and lead him to an understanding of the underlying idea or philosophy”.

The film was banned within Czechoslovakia upon its initial release in 1966 until 1967 due to its depictions and imagery of wasting food, but in 1966 the film won the Grand Prix at the Bergamo Film Festival in Italy. Daisies cemented Chytilová's career both nationally and internationally.

After Daisies the government made it very difficult for Chytilová to find work within Czechoslovakia, even though she was never officially classified as a 'blacklisted' director.

Her follow-up film,  Ovoce stromů rajských jíme (Fruit of Paradise; 1969), was her last film before the Soviet Union invasion of 1968. After the Soviet Union invasion it was virtually impossible for Chytilová to find work and she resorted to directing commercials under her husband's name, Jaroslav Kučera.

In 1976, due to the low cinema attendance Chytilová was approached by the government to begin directing films through one of the state run production companies, Short Film Studios. At the same time the United States was assembling a 'Year of Women' Film Festival and contacted Chytilová to gain permission to screen Daisies as their opening film.

Chytilová informed the festival that the only non-censored prints of the film could be found in Paris and Brussels. She also informed the festival that her government would not allow her to attend the festival, nor were they allowing her to direct films. The festival then began to apply international pressure upon the Czechoslovakian government by petitioning on Chytilová's behalf. In accordance with this international pressure, Chytilová wrote a letter directly to President Gustáv Husák detailing her career and her personal beliefs in socialism.

Due to the success of the international pressure, and Chytilová's personal appeal to President Husak, Chytilová began production of Hra o jablko (The Apple Game, 1976). The Apple Game was completed and then was screened at the Karlovy Vary International Film Festival, and won the Silver Hugo and the Chicago International Film Festival.

After the release of The Apple Game Chytilová was allowed to continue making films, but was continually met with controversy and heavy censorship by the Czechoslovak government. Věra Chytilová's last film was released in 2006, and she taught directing at FAMU.

Legacy
Chytilová described herself as a control freak and, “An overheated kettle that you can’t turn down”.  Chytilová's "overheated" attitude made it difficult for her to gain work within the Soviet Union controlled film industry. She was known as being actively critical of the Soviet Union, stating that “My critique is in the context of the moral principles you preach, isn’t it? A critical reflection is necessary”.  She would routinely cause havoc and "hysterical scenes" to attempt to make films that were loyal to her vision regardless of the heavy censorship that was routinely imposed.

Chytilová embodied a unique cinematographic language and style that does not rely on any literary or verbal conventions, but rather utilizes various forms of visual manipulations to create meaning within her films.  Chytilová used observations of everyday life in accordance with allegories and surreal contexts to create a personalized film style that is greatly influenced by the French New Wave, and Italian neorealism.

Chytilová actively used a filmic style similar to cinéma vérité in order to allow the audience to gain an outside perspective of the film. Her use of cinéma vérité is best illustrated in her 1966 film, Daisies, in which these techniques create a “philosophical documentary, of diverting the spectator from the involvement, destroying psychology and accentuates the humor”. Through these manipulations Chytilová created a disjunctive viewing experience for her audience forcing them to question the meaning of her films.

Chytilová is cited as a militant feminist filmmaker. Josef Škvorecký states that, “In a true feminist tradition Vera combined intensive intellectual effort with a feminine feeling for beauty and form”.  Daisies is seen as a feminist film due to its attitude and active critique of male attitudes towards sex. However, Chytilová did not see herself as a feminist filmmaker, but rather believed in individualism, stating that if a person does not believe in a particular set of conventions or rules then it is up to that individual to break them.

Personal life and death
Chytilová was born in Ostrava, Czechoslovakia, on 2 February 1929.  She refused to leave Czechoslovakia after the Soviet Union Invasion of 1968 stating that “Making films then became a mission”.  She married cinematographer Jaroslav Kučera whom she met while attending FAMU.   During the Soviet Union occupation, when Chytilová could not find work as a director, she and her husband built their family home and raised their children – an artist Tereza Kučerová (born 1964) and cinematographer Štěpán Kučera (born 1968).

Chytilová died on 12 March 2014 in Prague, surrounded by her family, after long-term health issues. She was 85.

Selected filmography
{| class="wikitable"
|-
! Year !! Title !! Director !! Screenplay !! Story !! Music
|-
| 1961 || The Ceiling ||  ||  ||  || 
|-
| 1962 || A Bagful of Fleas ||  ||  ||  || 
|-
| 1963 || Something Different ||  ||  ||  || 
|-
| 1966 || "At the World Cafeteria" in Pearls of the Deep||  ||  ||  || 
|-
| 1966 || Daisies ||  ||  ||  || 
|-
| 1970 || Fruit of Paradise ||  ||  ||  || 
|-
| 1976 || The Apple Game ||  ||  ||  || 
|-
| 1978 || Inexorable Time ||  ||  || || 
|-
| 1979 || Prefab Story ||  ||  ||  || 
|-
| 1981 || Calamity ||  ||  ||  || 
|-
| 1981 || Chytilová Versus Forman − Consciousness of Continuity ||  ||  ||  || 
|-
| 1983 || The Very Late Afternoon of the Faun ||  ||  ||  || 
|-
| 1984 || Prague: The Restless Heart of Europe ||  ||  ||  || 
|-
| 1987 || Wolf's Hole ||  ||  ||  || 
|-
| 1987 || The Jester and the Queen ||  ||  ||  || 
|-
| 1988 || A Hoof Here, a Hoof There ||  ||  ||  || 
|-
| 1990 || Tomáš Garrigue Masaryk, a Liberator ||  ||  ||  || 
|-
| 1991 || My Citizens of Prague Understand Me ||  ||  || || 
|-
| 1992 || The Inheritance or Fuckoffguysgoodday  ||
|  ||  || 
|-
| 1998 || Trap, Trap, Little Trap ||
|  ||  || 
|-
| 2000 || Flights and Falls ||
|  ||  || 
|-
| 2001 || Exile from Paradise ||
|  ||  || 
|-
| 2005 || 'Searching for Ester ||  ||  ||  || 
|-
| 2006 || Pleasant Moments ||
|  ||
|}

References

Further reading
Criterion Collection Essay
Owen, Jonathan Avant-garde to New Wave: Czechoslovak Cinema, Surrealism and the Sixties''. Berghahn Books (February 15, 2011)

External links

 
 Additional Information and Timeline
 Criterion Collection

 
1929 births
2014 deaths
Film people from Ostrava
Czech film directors
Czechoslovak film directors
Czech screenwriters
Academy of Performing Arts in Prague alumni
Czech women film directors
Recipients of Medal of Merit (Czech Republic)
Czech women screenwriters